The third and final season of the American comedy television series Gilligan's Island commenced airing in the United States on September 12, 1966, and concluded on April 17, 1967, on CBS. The third season continues the comic adventures of seven castaways as they attempted to survive and escape from an island on which they had been shipwrecked. Most episodes revolve around the dissimilar castaways' conflicts and their failed attempts—invariably Gilligan's fault—to escape their plight. The season originally aired on Mondays at 7:30-8:00 pm (EST).

Originally, it was planned for the series to be renewed at the conclusion of its third season, but at the last minute, CBS decided to renew their older show Gunsmoke (which soon vaulted to the top five in the rankings) and drop Gilligan's Island. This came as a shock to both the cast, crew, and series creator Sherwood Schwartz. At the time of its cancellation, the series was ranked 44th out of 101 shows in total. Immediately following the cessation of the show, it was sold into syndication, wherein it became a major success. However, Schwartz was forced to hire lawyers and audit United Artists film studio because they did not pay royalties in a timely fashion.

Critically, the season was initially brushed off, but contemporary reviews have seen the season in a much more positive light. Many critics have also commented on the season's use of guest stars and dream sequences. On July 26, 2005, the complete season was released on DVD by Warner Home Video subsidiary Turner Home Entertainment; the set included all 30 of the episodes, along with commentary on "The Producer" and several other bonus features.

Production 
Executive producers for the third season of Gilligan's Island included William Froug and series creator Sherwood Schwartz. Filming of the season took place at the CBS Radford Studios complex in Studio City, Los Angeles California. This complex contained 17 sound stages, as well as special effects and prop departments. On one stage, a lagoon had been constructed by the production company "at great expense". According to Bob Denver, the crew would spend half of their days filming scenes in the lagoon. Shots and sequences involving the characters' were filmed in a different soundstage. After the series' cancellation, the show's lagoon was not dismantled, and it remained in place until 1995, when it was converted into a parking lot.

Cast 
The series employed an ensemble cast of seven main actors and actresses. Denver played the role of the titular First Mate Gilligan, a bumbling, naive, and accident-prone crewman who often messes up the castaways chances of rescue. Alan Hale, Jr. portrayed The Skipper, captain of the S.S. Minnow and the older friend of Gilligan. Jim Backus appeared as Thurston Howell III, a millionaire, and Natalie Schafer played his wife, Eunice Lovelle Wentworth Howell. Tina Louise played the role Ginger Grant, a famous movie star. Russell Johnson portrayed Professor Roy Hinkley, Ph.D., a high school science teacher who often uses his scientific background to try to find ways to get the castaways off the island. Dawn Wells played Mary Ann Summers, wholesome farm girl from Kansas. Charles Maxwell was the uncredited voice of the radio announcer, who the castaways would often listen via their radio.

The season also featured several notable guest stars. Comedy actor Phil Silvers appears as the film director Harold Hecuba in the episode "The Producer". John McGiver plays the role of Lord Beasley in the episode "Man with a Net". Eddie Little Sky appears as a native in both "Voodoo" and "Topsy-Turvy". Vito Scotti reprises his role as Boris Balinkoff in the episode "Ring Around Gilligan"; he had previously appeared in the second season episode "The Friendly Physician". Allan Jaffe and Roman Gabriel—a Los Angeles Rams quarterback—appear as natives in "Topsy-Turvy". Don Rickles plays the role of the criminal in "The Kidnapper". In the episode "Take a Dare", Strother Martin portrays George Barkley, a contestant on the titular game show. In "The Hunter", Rory Calhoun plays the role of Jonathan Kincaid, and Harold Sakata portrays his assistant, Ramoo. Denny Miller plays the character Tongo, and Janos Prohaska plays the gorilla in the episode "Our Vines Have Tender Apes". Miller had previously appeared in the show as lost surfer Duke Williams in the first season episode "Big Man on Little Stick". In the episode "Splashdown", Chick Hearn, George Neise, Scott Graham, and Jim Spencer all play astronauts or officials of NASA. Jim Lefebrve, Al Ferrara, and Pete Sotos play headhunters in the episode "High Man on the Totem Pole". Midori and Michael Forest appears as Kalani and Ugundi, respectively, in "Slave Girl". In "The Pigeon", Sterling Holloway plays the role of Burt the prisoner. Finally, in "Gilligan the Goddess", Stanley Adams plays King Killiwani.

Broadcast history

Ratings and syndication 
The season originally aired Mondays at 7:30-8:00 pm (EST) on CBS. According to Arbitron, the season's first episode, "Up at Bat", received an 11.8 rating and a 23 share. Arbitron—later renamed Nielsen—ratings were audience measurement systems that determine the audience size and composition of television programming in the U.S. At the time, this meant that roughly 11.8 percent of all television-equipped households, and 23 percent of households watching television, were tuned in to the episode. Despite a drop in the ratings when compared to the previous two seasons, Gilligan's Island was still performing solidly in its third year and helped build "excellent" lead-ins for the series that aired directly afterwards on Monday nights. At the time of its cancellation, the series was ranked 44th out of 101 shows in total.

Following the season's end, and the series' cancellation, the show was sold into syndication by United Artists film studio, where it was particularly successful; at one point, it became the most syndicated television series to air. However, after four years in syndication, United Artists still had not announced to Schwartz that the series had turned a profit. Schwartz, familiar with the budgets that had been required to film the episodes, doubted this claim and audited the studio. To finance this endeavor, he used his earnings from his ABC series The Brady Bunch; this conflict later caused him to joke that every television writer or producer needs two hits in which "the second one [provides] the money for the lawsuit on the first one." Eventually, Schwartz and the studio reached an agreement without going to trial. While Schwartz made large sums of money due to syndication earnings, Wells revealed that the cast of the show never received any compensation.

Cancellation controversy 

CBS executive Mike Dann had congratulated Schwartz on the renewal of Gilligan's Island while the show was in the midst of filming its third season. Schwartz then revealed the news to the cast and crew, to much celebration. Dawn Wells and Russ Johnson even purchased new homes, feeling satisfied with the future of the show supposedly secured. However, after several weeks, Schwartz never heard back from CBS Business Affairs, the department officially tasked with announcing the renewal of the show, even though the series appeared on the network's planned schedule for the following year. Schwartz soon learned that when William S. Paley, the chief executive who contributed largely to CBS's success, had learned that his and his wife's favorite television series, Gunsmoke was being canceled due to falling ratings, he demanded that the network find a way to re-add the drama into the 1967–68 United States network television schedule. Desperate, the program associates at CBS went into an "emergency session" and decided to cancel a new series called Doc, along with Gilligan's Island, and reschedule Gunsmoke in their place, at 7:30 (EST) on Mondays. Paley, who did not enjoy Gilligan's Island, found this plan acceptable. For Gunsmoke, this was a resounding success; the series rebounded, gaining an entirely new audience, vaulting to the top five in the Nielsen Ratings for the 1967–68 season (far exceeding previous ratings for Gilligan's Island) and staying in the top ten for six consecutive seasons, finally being cancelled after its twentieth season.

Reception and release

Reception 
Initially, the season—along with the series as a whole—was met with critical scorn, but was extremely popular with "the young crowd". Contemporary reviews have been largely positive, with many commenting upon the season's use of guest stars and dream sequences. Stuart Galbraith IV of DVD Talk noted that since "the series had exhausted every reasonably plausible story situation that could be derived from its limited premise, of seven castaways shipwrecked on an uncharted island in the Pacific […] the show's writers looked for any excuse to cut loose […] and by the third season this seemed like every other episode, dream sequences became the modus operandi." He concluded that, "at its best the show offers immensely likable characters in broadly funny situations that are, in the end, timeless."

DVD release 
On July 26, 2005, the complete season was released on DVD by Warner Home Video subsidiary Turner Home Entertainment. The release included all 30 episodes on three discs, with an aspect ratio of 1.33:1. The set also included close-captioning, and subtitles in English, Spanish, and French. The audio is presented in Dolby Digital 2.0 mono. Extras include a season introduction by Schwartz, episode commentary for "The Producer", and the short documentary Gilligan's Island: A Pop Culture Phenomenon.

Episodes

Footnotes

References 

 
 
 
 
 

Gilligan's Island (season 3)